Abdulla Yaameen (born 30 December 2000), is a Maldivian footballer who plays as a midfielder for Club Green Streets.

Club career

Green Streets
On 25 February 2017, he made his debut in the Malé League match against Victory Sports Club at the final eight minutes of a 1–0 victory.

International career
Yaameen's first international match was a 3–2 defeat against Singapore on 23 March 2018 at the National Stadium, Singapore, replacing Ali Fasir at stoppage time in the second half to become the youngest player to play for Maldives at the age of 17 years and 85 days, breaking the record of Ali Ashfaq.

References

External links
 
 Abdulla Yaameen at worldfootball.com

2000 births
Living people
Maldivian footballers
Association football midfielders
Maldives international footballers